The Super Bullet Maglev is an experimental Chinese high-speed maglev train, with a maximum designed speed of 620 kph. Built at Southwest Jiaotong University, the prototype was unveiled on January 13, 2021, at a test track in Chengdu, Sichuan. The train uses liquid nitrogen to achieve superconductivity, according to the State Key Laboratory of Traction Power.

References 

High-speed trains of China
High-speed rail in China
Maglev